The Celebrated Scandal is a lost 1915 silent film feature directed by James Durkin and starring Betty Nansen. Although the film's copyright registration states that J. Gordon Edwards "picturized" the film, the opinion of film historians, including the American Film Institute, is that while Edwards may have worked on an discarded earlier version, he did not contribute to the picture as released. The Celebrated Scandal was produced and distributed by the Fox Film Corporation.

Plot

Cast
Betty Nansen - Teodora
Edward José - Don Julian
Walter Hitchcock - Don Severo
Stuart Holmes - Alvarez
Wilmuth Merkyl - Ernesto (*as John Merkyl)
Helen Robertson -  Mercedes

See also
List of Fox Film films
1937 Fox vault fire
The World and His Wife (1920)
Lovers (1927)

References

External links
 The Celebrated Scandal at IMDb.com

1915 films
American silent feature films
Lost American films
Fox Film films
American black-and-white films
1910s American films